Portofino Lighthouse is an active lighthouse located in Portofino, Metropolitan City of Genoa, Liguria, northern Italy, on the western extremity of the peninsula in the Gulf of Tigullio.

Description
The lighthouse is completely automated, powered by a solar unit and is operated by the Marina Militare with the identification code number 1675 E.F.

See also
 List of lighthouses in Italy
 Portofino

References

External links

 Servizio Fari Marina Militare

Lighthouses in Italy